Belvoir Castle is a faux historic castle and stately home in  Leicestershire, England, situated  west of the town of Grantham and  northeast of Melton Mowbray. The Castle was first built immediately after the Norman Conquest of 1066 and has since been rebuilt at least three times, the surviving structure, a grade I listed mock castle, dating from the early 19th century. It remains the private property of the Duke of Rutland but is open to the general public.

The castle is situated at the extreme northern corner of the county of Leicestershire and is sandwiched between Lincolnshire to the east and Nottinghamshire at west, and overlooks the Vale of Belvoir to the northwest on the Nottinghamshire border. It is surrounded by the villages of Redmile, Woolsthorpe, Knipton, Harston, Harlaxton, Croxton Kerrial and Bottesford. The antiquarian John Leland (d.1552) stated: "the Castle stands on the very nape of a high hill, steep up each way, partly by nature, partly by the working of men's hands." 

History

Norman fortification

A Norman castle originally stood on the high ground within the wapentake of Framland, overlooking the adjacent wapentake of Winnibriggs. in Lincolnshire and dominating both. It was built on the land of Robert de Todeni, mentioned in the Domesday Book of 1086, and inherited from him by William d'Aubigny. It then eventually passed to William's granddaughter Isabel, who married Robert de Ros circa 1234.

Belvoir was a royal manor until it was granted to Robert de Ros in 1257. He was given a licence to crenellate in 1267. When the male de Ros line died out in 1508, the manor and castle passed to George Manners, 11th Baron de Ros, nephew of the last de Ros baron, who inherited the castle and barony through his mother. His son was created Earl of Rutland in 1525.

Tudor manor 
By 1464, the Norman castle was recorded to be ruins. In 1528, Thomas Manners, 1st Earl of Rutland  started construction of a large Tudor manor house.  It was completed in 1555.  Much of the stone for this building came from Croxton Abbey and Belvoir Priory following their dissolution.

Two local carpenters refurbished the billiard table in 1602 and a new baize cloth was bought from a merchant in Grantham. James VI and I, Prince Henry and the Venetian ambassador Antonio Foscarini stayed in August 1612. In the early 17th century, servants Joan, Margaret and Phillipa Flower were accused of murdering the 6th Earl's two young sons by witchcraft. Joan died while in prison and Margaret and Phillipa were hanged.

During the English Civil War, it was one of the more notable strongholds of the king's supporters and King Charles spent a night here on his way into Lincolnshire.

Country house
In 1649, the Tudor building was razed by Parliamentarians because of the family's support for the Royalists. But six years later, construction on a large family home - designed by the architect John Webb - was started in 1654. Work was completed by 1668 and cost £11,730 (£ million today).

The 9th Earl was created Duke of Rutland in 1703. Belvoir Castle has been the home of the Manners family for five hundred years and seat of the Dukes of Rutland for over three centuries.

Georgian revival 

In 1799, the 5th Duke of Rutland married Lady Elizabeth Howard. The new Duchess of Rutland soon chose architect James Wyatt to rebuild the castle in the romantic Gothic Revival style. The Duke, one of the wealthiest landholders in the United Kingdom of Great Britain and Ireland, sold seven assorted villages and their surrounding lands to fund the massive project. The project was nearing completion when, on 26 October 1816, it was almost destroyed by a fire. The loss - including pictures by Titian, Rubens, van Dyck, and Reynolds - was estimated at £120,000 (£ million today).

Rebuilt, again, to largely the same designs, at a cost of an additional £82,000 (£ million today), the castle was largely completed by 1832. The architect Sir James Thornton (who was the Duke's friend and chaplain and Vicar of nearby Bottesford) was chiefly responsible for this rebuilding, and the result bears a superficial resemblance to a medieval castle, its central tower reminiscent of Windsor Castle.

Whilst visiting Belvoir castle in the 1840s, Anna, Duchess of Bedford, found that the normal time for dinner was between 7:00 and 8:30 p.m. An extra meal called luncheon had been created to fill the midday gap between breakfast and dinner, but as this new meal was very light, the long afternoon with no refreshment at all left people feeling hungry. She found a light meal of tea (usually Darjeeling) and cakes or sandwiches was the perfect balance. The Duchess found taking an afternoon snack to be such a perfect refreshment that she soon began inviting her friends to join her. Afternoon tea quickly became an established and convivial repast in many middle and upper class households.

The castle is open to the public and contains many works of art. The highlights of the tour are the lavish staterooms, the most famous being the Elizabeth Saloon (named after the wife of the 5th Duke), the Regents Gallery and the Roman-inspired State Dining Room.

The Queen's Royal Lancers regimental museum of the 17th and 21st Lancers was established here in 1964, but was required to leave in October 2007. The Royal Lancers and Nottinghamshire Yeomanry Museum is now at Thoresby Hall.

Estate
The castle sits in an estate of almost .

Gardens

Belvoir Gardens were designed and landscaped by Elizabeth Howard, 5th Duchess of Rutland, who was married to John Manners, the 5th Duke of Rutland. They were created in 1799, the year Belvoir Castle was built. There are many unusual features to the gardens, for example the natural amphitheatre which faces the estate was formed by the moraines of glaciers and a 'root house' or summer house which survives to this day. This natural amphitheatre is embedded with fresh water springs to ensure blooming plants throughout the year.

Belvoir Gardens were also the first site of mass spring flower bedding, a concept developed by Mr Divers, head gardener of the gardens at the time.

The once thriving gardens are now slowly being restored to their former glory. "Friends of Belvoir Gardens" is a programme which encourages enthusiasts with green fingers to volunteer to help manage the beautifully preserved gardens.

Name

The castle's name means beautiful view. In 2018, the 11th Duchess of Rutland gave a televised tour of the castle to journalist Phil Spencer, explaining how the name Belvoir is a Norman import by the French-speaking invaders of the 11th century, but the native Anglo-Saxon population was unable to pronounce such a foreign word, preferring to call it "Beaver Castle"a usage which persists today.

Mausoleum
The traditional burial place of the Manners family was St Mary the Virgin's Church, Bottesford. Since elevation to the dukedom in 1703 most Dukes have been buried in the grounds of the mausoleum at Belvoir Castle. The mausoleum at Belvoir Castle was built by The 5th Duke of Rutland, following the death of his wife, Elizabeth Howard (1780-1825), daughter of The 5th Earl of Carlisle. After its construction, most of the 18th century monuments in Belton Church were moved to the mausoleum which then became the family's main place of burial.

Burials
The following members of the Manners family are buried in the mausoleum:
John Manners, 1st Duke of Rutland
John Manners, 2nd Duke of Rutland
John Manners, 3rd Duke of Rutland
Charles Manners, 4th Duke of Rutland
John Manners, 5th Duke of Rutland
Marion Margaret Violet Lindsay Manners, Duchess of Rutland
Duff Cooper, 1st Viscount Norwich, son-in-law of 8th Duke
Diana Cooper, Viscountess Norwich
Charles Manners, 10th Duke of Rutland

In literature
Letitia Elizabeth Landon's poem  is inscribed to Lady Emmeline Stuart-Wortley, daughter of John Manners, 5th Duke of Rutland. The poem illustrates a painting by Thomas Allom.
In 2012, Catherine Bailey published a history of Belvoir Castle chronicling a mystery surrounding one of its occupants, John Manners, the 9th Duke of Rutland, which she encountered and worked to unravel while researching in the estate's archives.

Present use
A portion of the castle is still used as the family home of the Manners family.  Several films and television programmes have used it as a location including Little Lord Fauntleroy (1980); The Da Vinci Code; Young Sherlock Holmes (1985); The Young Victoria (2007); Jack and the Beanstalk: The Real Story (2001); the 1999 version of The Haunting; King Ralph (1991) and  The Crown.

The grounds are used by the Belvoir Cricket Club and for the hosting of events including, in 2009, the CLA Game Fair. Each year since 2013 (with the exception of 2020 due to Covid restriction), over the autumnal equinox the Equinox24, a 24-hour ultra marathon, has been held, with runners covering a  circuit through the country estate, with the castle as a backdrop. In November 2014, Emma Manners, Duchess of Rutland appointed Timothy Grayson as the castle's poet-in-residence. Briery Wood Heronry is a biological Site of Special Scientific Interest in the grounds. In August 2010, the castle's website was mistakenly hacked and taken over by an Algerian group who blanked the pages and inserted anti-Semitic texts in Arabic. The hackers had mistaken Belvoir Castle for Belvoir Fortress, which is located in Israel.

See also
Belvoir disambiguation page
List of castles in Leicestershire
Treasure Houses of Britain, 1985 TV documentary that is, in part, on Belvoir Castle

References

External links

Official website

Belvoir Castle view video retrieved 18 December 2010

Houses in Leicestershire
Castles in Leicestershire
Gothic Revival architecture in Leicestershire
Grade I listed buildings in Leicestershire
Mock castles in England
Historic house museums in Leicestershire
Gardens in Leicestershire
Gardens by Capability Brown
Burial sites of the Manners family